Transported is an Australian convict melodrama film directed by W. J. Lincoln. It is considered a lost film.

Plot
In England, Jessie Grey is about to marry Leonard Lincoln but the evil Harold Hawk tries to force her to marry him and she wounds him with a gun. Hawk is arrested and sentenced to imprisonment in Australia. Leonard and Jessie get married and move to Australia. Hawk escapes from gaol and tries to get his revenge by kidnapping Jessie.

Cast
Roy Redgrave
Godfrey Cass
George Bryant

References

External links
Transported at IMDb
'Transported'' at AustLit
Transported at National Film and Sound Archive

1913 films
Australian black-and-white films
Australian silent short films
Lost Australian films
Australian drama films
1913 drama films
Melodrama films
Lost drama films
1913 lost films
Films directed by W. J. Lincoln
Silent drama films